Mudather Altayeb Ebrahim Altaher (born July 23, 1988), known as Mudather Karika, is a Sudanese striker who plays for Al-Zamala SC (Umrawaba) in the Umrawaba League.

Career

During the 2012 Africa Cup of Nations he scored twice to put Sudan through to the quarter finals.

Honours

Clubs
Al-Hilal Club
Sudan Premier League
Champion  (7) 2005, 2009, 2010, 2012, 2014, 2016, 2017
Sudan Cup
Winner  (3) 2009, 2011, 2016
Sudan National Football Team
CECAFA Cup
Champion  (1) 2007

International

International goals

Scores and results list Sudan's goal tally first.

References

External links
 at National - Football - Teams. Com
 Profile at GoalZZ.com
 Mudather El Tahir at footballdatabase.eu

1988 births
Living people
Sudanese footballers
Sudan international footballers
2011 African Nations Championship players
2012 Africa Cup of Nations players
Al-Hilal Club (Omdurman) players
People from Khartoum
Association football forwards
El Hilal SC El Obeid players
Sudan A' international footballers